Dr Karl Daniel Mullen (26 November 1926 – 27 April 2009) was an Irish rugby union player and consultant gynaecologist who captained the Irish rugby team and captained the British Lions on their 1950 tour to Australia and New Zealand.

Mullen was born in Courtown Harbour, Co. Wexford and educated at Belvedere College  and the Royal College of Surgeons in Ireland. He played as hooker, winning 25 caps for Ireland from 1947 to 1952. He captained the Irish team to their first Grand Slam in the 1948 Five Nations Championship and was one of eight players from that team who lived to see the country's next Grand Slam in 2009.

He was also selected to captain the 1950 Lions Tour to Australia and New Zealand, during which the Lions lost the Test series against the All Blacks 3-0, with one game drawn, but won the test series against Australia 2-0. He played four tests for the Lions on that tour; two against New Zealand and two against Australia. He missed the third and fourth tests against New Zealand through injury.

References

Irish rugby union players
Ireland international rugby union players
British & Irish Lions rugby union players from Ireland
Old Belvedere R.F.C. players
Irish gynaecologists
Rugby union hookers
1926 births
2009 deaths
People from County Wexford
People educated at Belvedere College
Alumni of the Royal College of Surgeons in Ireland
Rugby union players from County Wexford
20th-century Irish medical doctors